The Asian Pacific Thematic Historic District (APTHD), San Diego's historic Chinatown, is an eight-block district adjacent to and in part overlapping with the Gaslamp Quarter Historic District. The APTHD is bounded by Market Street on the north, 2nd Ave. on the west, 6th Ave. on the east and J St. on the south. 22 structures are considered historically contributing.

History
San Diego's Chinatown began in the area in the 1860s, settled by abalone fishermen. The area was once a thriving Chinatown full of Chinese and Chinese-Americans. However, in present day, the area no longer has an especially large Chinese population. After returning from service in World War II, Chinese-Americans moved to other areas of San Diego. The area was finally concluded as a Historic District during the redevelopment of the Gaslamp Quarter in the 1980s and 90s, when eventually dozens of Chinese owned businesses closed and the majority of the Chinese population began to dissipate.

The area was not only home to the Chinese community in San Diego, but was also shared by the Japanese and Filipino communities.

The City of San Diego designated the area a historic district in 1987.

A "makeover" by the Centre City Development Corporation is scheduled for completion in 2012.

Architecture and Contributing Buildings
The 22 contributing structures date from 1883-1930. Contribution is based on their relation in the Asian (mostly Chinese) community. Buildings include the San Diego Chinese Historical Museum and the San Diego Chinese Consolidated Benevolent Association.

The San Diego Chinese Historical Museum was built in 1927 elsewhere and was originally the Chinese Mission. It was moved to its present location in 1996. Murray K. Lee, curator of the museum, is as of January 2011 preparing a book about the history of Chinatown.

See also 
 Little Saigon, San Diego
 Stingaree, San Diego
 San Diego free speech fight
 Convoy Pan Asian Cultural & Business District

References

 Center City Redevelopment Corporation, "Asian Pacific Thematic Historic District Master Plan", approved August 15, 1995

External links
 San Diego Chinese Historical Museum - Houses a permanent collection of Chinatown artifacts, hosts rotating exhibits from all aspects of Chinese and Chinese American culture, presents tours and lectures of the museum and the Asian Pacific Thematic Historic District
San Diego Chinese Consolidated Benevolent Association

Asian-American culture in San Diego
Geography of San Diego
San Diego
Chinese-American culture in California
Historic districts in San Diego
Pacific Islands American culture in California